In the mathematical field of algebraic geometry, a singular point of an algebraic variety  is a point  that is 'special' (so, singular), in the geometric sense that at this point the tangent space at the variety may not be regularly defined. In case of varieties defined over the reals, this notion generalizes the notion of local non-flatness. A point of an algebraic variety which is not singular is said to be regular. An algebraic variety which has no singular point is said to be non-singular or smooth.

Definition 
A plane curve defined by an implicit equation
,
where  is a smooth function is said to be singular at a point if the Taylor series of  has order at least  at this point.

The reason for this is that, in differential calculus, the tangent at the point  of such a curve is defined by the equation

whose left-hand side is the term of degree one of the Taylor expansion. Thus, if this term is zero, the tangent may not be defined in the standard way, either because it does not exist or a special definition must be provided.

In general for a hypersurface

the singular points are those at which all the partial derivatives simultaneously vanish.

Points of  that are not singular are called non-singular or regular. It is always true that almost all points are non-singular, in the sense that the non-singular points form a set that is both open and dense in the variety (for the Zariski topology, as well as for the usual topology, in the case of varieties defined over the complex numbers).

In case of a real variety (that is the set of the points with real coordinates of a variety defined by polynomials with real coefficients), the variety is a manifold near every regular point. But it is important to note that a real variety may be a manifold and have singular points. For example the equation  defines a real analytic manifold but has a singular point at the origin. This may be explained by saying that the curve has two complex conjugate branches that cut the real branch at the origin.

Singular points of smooth mappings
Analysis of these singular points can be reduced to the algebraic variety case by considering the jets of the mapping. The th jet is the Taylor series of the mapping truncated at degree  and deleting the constant term.

Nodes
In classical algebraic geometry, certain special singular points were also called nodes. A node is a singular point where the Hessian matrix is non-singular; this implies that the singular point has multiplicity two and the tangent cone is not singular outside its vertex.

See also 
Milnor map
Resolution of singularities
Singular point of a curve
Singularity theory
Smooth scheme
Zariski tangent space

References

Algebraic varieties
Singularity theory